Delando Pratt was a member of the Wisconsin State Assembly.

Biography
Pratt was born in Southington, Connecticut in 1823. He was married to Imogene Pratt and they had at least two children. Pratt died in Platteville, Wisconsin in 1874.

Career
Pratt represented Sauk County, Wisconsin in the Assembly during the 1848 session. He was a Democrat.

References

People from Southington, Connecticut
People from Baraboo, Wisconsin
1823 births
1874 deaths
19th-century American politicians
Democratic Party members of the Wisconsin State Assembly